Kim Sung-hong (김성홍) (born August 7, 1956) is a South Korean film director.

Filmography
 Doctor (닥터, Dak teol) (2012)
 Missing (실종, Sil Jong) (2009)
 Say Yes (세이 예스 Sae-yi yaeseu) (2001)
 A Growing Business (신장개업, Shinjang gaeub) (1998)
 The Hole (올가미, Olgami) (1997)
 Deep Scratch (손톱, Sontob) (1994)
 Teenage Coup (열일곱살의 쿠데타 Yeolilgobsaleui coup d'etat) (1991)
 Well, Let's Look at the Sky Sometimes (그래 가끔 하늘을 보자, Geurae gaggeum haneuleul boja) (1990)

References

External links
 
 Korean Movie Database entry

South Korean film directors
1956 births
Living people
Place of birth missing (living people)